The Hawk Chronicles (also known as Hawk Chronicles: The Adventures of Kate Hawk) is a science fiction radio drama series produced and written by creator Steve Long. The series began airing on WCEM 1240 AM in 2015. It follows "the adventures of Detective Kate Hawk, who went from [being] a Baltimore police detective to intergalactic investigator."
Described as "a hard science-based sci-fi adventure,"  the show is set in modern-day and takes place on Earth, in space, and on alien planets. It initially focused almost exclusively on Kate Hawk and her adventures as a police investigator who moonlighted in space, but it has expanded its scope to follow other characters and plotlines in a soap opera-like format.

Plot
In Episode One, Detectives Kate Hawk and Jim Barnes of Baltimore's Special Investigations Section are dispatched to Little Italy, where Kate discovers that what appears to be a displaced monument from her hometown of Cambridge, MD, is really an interdimensional craft. She meets members of a parallel Earth's Intergalactic Defense Force (IDF), who recruit her as one of their agents. At first, Kate handles terrestrial missions for the IDF, but eventually she and her partner Barnes go "from fighting crime in the streets to crime in the stars." Their principal antagonists are Supreme Controller Lyster and Lord Zokar of the extremist group Rebels Against the Galactic Empire (RAGE).

Narrative notes
Kate Hawk was originally played by Kirsten Strohmer, who left for professional reasons. In Episode 81, Kate is caught in a devastating explosion on a spaceship and requires major facial reconstructive surgery and a new larynx. The character has been voiced by Susan Morgan since Episode 101.

History

Development
When Kirsten Strohmer told her co-worker at Cambridge's WCEM-AM (1240) that she was looking for more voice acting work, Steve Long created a project just for her. It became a space-adventure podcast called The Hawk Chronicles, to star Strohmer as Baltimore police detective Kate Hawk, who would go "traipsing through the galaxy, in pursuit of alien no-goodniks of all stripes." Strohmer described it as "a cross between Castle and Doctor Who."

Casting
For the other voice actors, Long called on acquaintances and friends he knew through the Doctor Who-themed photo booth he ran at sci-fi conventions. As the show progressed, people from around the U.S. as well as from Norway, Sweden, Great Britain, South Africa, and the Philippines joined the cast.

Production
Producer Long pens all of the stories himself, drawing inspiration from the BBC TV show Doctor Who, and including allusions to other famous genre fiction. Technical consultants read the scripts "to verify continuity and scientific feasibility"  before they are emailed out to actors. The voice artists record their parts individually at sound studios, using home mic setups, or even on their smart phones, and send in the audio files. In his home studio, Long mixes the voices together, along with sound effects and music, sometimes including elements he collected with his own digital recorder.

"It's a fun show to put together, but it can also be very frustrating," Long has said. Directorless actors occasionally mispronounce names and overstretch deadlines.

Music and sound
All music heard in the show is created in Sonicfire Pro 5 and Band in a Box. Most of the sound effects were captured on a handheld digital recorder or came from a collection of royalty-free effects.

Broadcast
After Long had recorded 16 episodes, his former employer, MTS Broadcasting, wanted The Hawk Chronicles for an introduction to the program "When Radio Was." The twelve-minute serial debuted on WCEM 1240 AM out of Cambridge in May 2015, airing Fridays at 12:30pm.

In June 2016, the show began airing from Episode One on the Arlington, Va, station WERA-LP 96.7 FM at 2:30pm on Sundays  as a two-part, 26-minute program. The first segment featured discussion and interviews with specialists in writing, acting, science, police work, medicine, and other fields. The second segment was the scripted adventure.

In March 2018, The Hawk Chronicles moved from WCEM to WHCP-LP 101.5 FM, also in Cambridge, where it still airs on Fridays at 11am and Sundays at 2pm.

From Episode 1 through Episode 40, the length of the weekly installments averaged 12 minutes. From Episode 57, all but two installments have been over 20 minutes long. As of March 2022, 177 episodes, plus the unnumbered "A Hawk Chronicles Christmas," had aired. The episodes also are available for streaming and download online at Apple Podcasts, Spreaker, Spotify, iHeartRadio, Google Podcasts, Castbox, Deezer, and Podcast Addict.

Reception
The Hawk Chronicles was recognized as one of Baltimore Magazine's Ten Best Podcasts of 2015. It received Audio Verse Awards nominations in 2017, 2018, and 2019, and was nominated for Best Podcast in the 2016 Geekie Awards.

A Reddit reviewer said in March 2018 that this "obscure" audio drama deserved more listeners because it is rare "to find a genre show that has gone for so long and consistently avoids idiot ball actions by the villains or the heroes or problem-dissolving Deus ex machinas."

Ratings
When Spreaker ceased tracking in early 2020, there were over 5,000 on-demand plays. By the same time, there had been 24,800 downloads, for a total of more than 30,000. This figure does not include listens from the show's website, full radio-versions on Mixcloud, plays from other podcasts specializing in radio dramas, or the audience for the radio broadcasts.

Cast
 Kirsten Strohmer as Agent Kate Hawk and others (Episode 1–81)
 Susan Morgan as Agent Kate Hawk (Episode 101–present)
 Steve Long as Agent Jim Barnes / Von Langer / Wilson / Mission Control, others
 Gary Crouch as Special Agent Horace Hawk / Lord Zokar ("WiFi") 
 Skip Windsor as Off. Vivian Nelson / Lord Lyster 
 Jon Macinta as John Pearman / Controller / Det. Mack / Robo4 / Sprague, others
 Chris Weissenborn as Capt. Nate
 Kristen Merritt as Kelly Hawk Merritt
 Alexander Nilsen as Soren Hansen / Vlad / Professor Lin
 Simon Fisher-Becker as Agent Tony Simon / Dracmar  
 Richard Starling as Det. Hernandez / Mondu / others
 Gerard O'Brien as Jake Holliday / Dimitri Karloff / Sam the Hongan
 Tyler Butler as Rick Rogers / Gagliastri, others
 Clive Ward as Jaffra the bounty hunter / Director Cage
 Tracey Wickersham as Det. Tracy Richards, others
 Stephanie Kline as Lenora
 Jessica Quinn as Ginger
 Deanna D. Parker as Capt. McCall
 Tammy Fields as Capt. Tam Fielder
 Claudia Fahey as Gabby / Ship's computer
 Tony Dugdale as Brady the Merchant / Major Dunn
 Chase Merritt as Jocko
 Bernie Dryden as Det. Farnsworth
 Chris Farley as Tesla
 Maury Stanley as Pennypacker
 Frank Stout as Major Whitt
 Richard Story as Carlos, others
 Amanda Guzman Reese as Bella
 Maddy Crouch as Teka / Ship's computer
 Bruce McWilliams as Commander Simms
 Fred Poole as Jeremy Parks
 Wayne Pierce as Det. Garrett
 Joseph McGrail as JoMac
 Thomas Ward as Col. Rada / Jamison
 P. Ryan Anthony as Col. Zandu / Hank the Hongan / Doctor D, others

Also: Ulysses Campbell, Andrew Todd, B.J. Wheatley, Matt Phillips, Cynthia Long Windsor, Lauren Greenhawk, Owen Strohmer, Laura Poole, David Coe, Pamela Coe, Fredrik Bourdette, Mary Allewalt, Lee Reece, Troy Hill, Lyn Vinson, Jessica Nilsen, Amanda Larsson, Raymone Rayburn, Claire Merritt, Renee Silva, Emilie Knud-Hansen, Matt Fahey, David Greer, Laura Todd, Travis Todd, Lyn Hopkins, Martin Hopkins, Jeanette Rayburn, Robert Coe, Ann Robinson, Sunday Kaminski, Samuel Pomerantz, Tom Yates, Susan Long, Kathy Stanfield, Jacquelin O'Neal, Amanda Fox, Ron Dowd, David Cannel, Elizabeth Randall, Heather Sharp, Jenny Steel, Deana Long Karpavage, Garret Macinta, Tracey Johns, Joshua Perusse, Victoria Perusse

References

External links
 

American science fiction radio programs
Radio dramas
Science fiction podcasts
2015 radio dramas